The men's tanding 95 kg kilograms competition at the 2018 Asian Games took place from 23 to 29 August 2018 at Padepokan Pencak Silat, Taman Mini Indonesia Indah, Jakarta, Indonesia.

Pencak silat is traditional Indonesian martial arts. Pencak silat is assessed from a punch, kick, sweep, and dings. The target that must be addressed is the patron in the body of every fighter who competed. Each judge gives an individual score for each competitor. The score given to each boxer would be taken from all 5 judges.

A total of nine competitors from nine different countries competed in this Class J event, limited to fighters whose body weight was less than 95 kilograms.

Nguyễn Văn Trí of Vietnam won the gold medal.

Schedule
All times are Western Indonesia Time (UTC+07:00)

Results
Legend
DQ — Won by disqualification

References

External links
Official website

Men's tanding 95 kg